Wesley is a name with an Anglo-Norman etymology. The "wes" portion of the name refers to the Western cardinal direction, while the word "lea" refers to a field, pasture, or other clearing in a forest. Thus, the name's origin refers to a "western lea," or a field to the west.

The name was predominantly used as a surname until John Wesley, founder of the Methodist church, inspired some parents to name their sons after him.

Surname
The Wesley family, founders of Methodism and noted musicians, including:
Samuel Wesley (poet) (1662–1735), minister and Stuart poet
John Wesley (1703–1791), son of the above, the principal founder of the Methodist denomination of Protestant Christianity
Charles Wesley (1707–1788), younger brother of the above, Methodist leader and prolific hymn writer
Charles Wesley junior (1757–1834), son of the above, organist, composer
Samuel Wesley (1766–1837), younger brother of the above, organist, composer
Samuel Sebastian Wesley (1810–1876), son of the above, organist, composer
Susanna Wesley (1669–1742), wife of Samuel Wesley (poet)
Antoine Wesley (born 1997), American football player
Arthur Wellesley, 1st Duke of Wellington (1769–1852), a British soldier and statesman best known for defeating Napoleon, was born as Arthur Wesley
August Wesley (1887–1942), Finnish journalist, trade unionist and revolutionary
Billy Wesley (born 1971), American politician
Blake Wesley (ice hockey) (born 1959), former Canadian professional ice hockey player
Blake Wesley (basketball) (born 2003), American basketball player
Charles Wesley (1896–1944), Negro league baseball player
Dante Wesley (born 1979), American football player
David Wesley (born 1970), retired American basketball player
Fred Wesley (born 1943), American jazz trombonist
Glen Wesley (born 1968), former Canadian National Hockey League player
John Wesley (guitarist) (born 1962), American musician
Mary Wesley (1912–2002), British author
Paul Wesley (born 1982), American actor
Richard Wesley (born 1945), African American playwright
Rutina Wesley (born 1979), American actress
Dorsey Wesley, American record producer known as Megahertz
Walt Wesley (born 1945), former American basketball player
William Wesley (born 1964), American basketball player and agent

Given name
Wesley Addy (1913–1996), American actor
Wesley Anderson (born 1969), American film director
Wesley Augusto Henn Marth (born 2000), Brazilian football player
Wesley Barbosa De Morais (born 1981), Brazilian football player
Wesley G. Bush (born 1961), American business executive
Wesley Chesbro (born 1951), California Assemblyman and Senator
Wesley Chu (born 1976), American science fiction writer
Wesley Clark (born 1944), American military general, and politician
Wesley Correira (born 1978), American mixed martial artist
Wesley Cox (born 1955), American basketball player
Wesley Craven (1939–2015), American filmmaker
Wesley David de Oliveira Andrade (born 2000), Brazilian football player
Wesley Duncan (born 1980), American politician
Wesley Eure (born 1951), American actor
Wesley Fofana (footballer) (born 2000), French footballer
Wesley Fofana (rugby union) (born 1988), French rugby union player
Wesley French (born 1996), American football player
Wesley Henderson (born 1951), American architect, historian, and educator
Wesley Klein (born 1988), winner of the second series of Popstars (Netherlands)
Wesley Korir (born 1982), Kenyan athlete and politician
Wesley Lopes Beltrame (born 1987), Brazilian footballer
Wesley Lopes da Silva (born 1980), Brazilian footballer
Wesley Matthews (born 1986), American basketball player
Wesley Moraes (born 1996), Brazilian football player
Wesley Morgan (born 1990), Canadian actor and model
Wes Nelson (born 1998), English television personality and singer
Wesley Pruden (1935–2019), American journalist
Wesley Ira Purkey (1952–2020), American convicted murderer
Wesley Santos (born 1991), Brazilian footballer
Wesley Scantlin (born 1972), Guitarist and singer for Puddle Of Mudd
 Wesley Simms, co-founder of the Redfern All Blacks, an Indigenous Australian rugby league club
Wesley Sneijder (born 1984), Dutch footballer
Wesley Snipes (born 1962), American actor
Wesley So (born 1993), Filipino chess player
Wesley Somerville (born 1941), Northern Irish loyalist paramilitary
Wesley Stromberg (born 1993), American musician, member of band Emblem3
Wesley Tann (1928–2012), American fashion designer
Wesley Timoteo (born 2000), Canadian soccer player
Wesley Willis (1963–2003), American cult musician and painter

Fictional characters
Wesley Dodds, the first of many DC Comics superheroes using the name Sandman
Westley, from The Princess Bride, a 1973 novel and 1987 film
Wesley "Wes" Collins, from Power Rangers Time Force
Wesley Crusher, in the television series Star Trek: The Next Generation
Wesley T. Owens, in the television series Mr. Belvedere
Wesley Pegden, from Last of the Summer Wine
Wesley Wyndam-Pryce, from the television series Angel, originally introduced in Buffy the Vampire Slayer
Robert Wesley, in the Star Trek franchise

See also
 Wesly, given name
 Wescley, given name
 Wes (given name)
 Westley (disambiguation)
 Wesley Brown (disambiguation)

References 

English masculine given names